Josh Elliott is an American businessman and politician serving as a member of the Connecticut House of Representatives from the 88th district. Elected in November 2016, he assumed office in 2017.

Early life and education 
Elliott was born in Guilford, Connecticut and raised in Hamden. He earned a Bachelor of Arts degree in sociology from Ithaca College and a Juris Doctor from the Quinnipiac University School of Law.

Career 
After graduating from law school, Elliott opened two grocery stores with his mother, Mary Ellen Stearman. Elliott was elected to the Connecticut House of Representatives in November 2016 and assumed office in 2017. During the 2019–2020 legislative session, Elliott was vice chair of the House Commerce Committee. In the 2021–2022 session, he is co-chair of the Higher Education and Employment Advancement Committee.

Elliott is currently exploring a run for Secretary of the State of Connecticut in 2022, vying to replace the retiring Denise Merrill.

References 

Living people
Year of birth missing (living people)
People from Guilford, Connecticut
People from Hamden, Connecticut
Ithaca College alumni
Quinnipiac University alumni
Democratic Party members of the Connecticut House of Representatives